The 2016 Turkish Super Cup (Turkish: TFF Süper Kupa) was the 43rd edition of the Turkish Super Cup since its establishment as Presidential Cup in 1966, the annual Turkish football season-opening match contested by the winners of the previous season's top league and cup competitions (or cup runner-up in case the league- and cup-winning club is the same). It took place on 13 August 2016 at the Konya Metropolitan Municipality Stadium in Konya, and was contested between Beşiktaş, the 2015–16 Süper Lig winners, and Galatasaray, the 2015–16 Turkish Cup winners.

Played in front of a crowd of 33,700, the Galatasaray defeated Beşiktaş 3–0 on penalties after 1–1 tie in 120 minutes. Galatasaray's victory marked their 15th Turkish Super Cup triumph.

Match

Details

References

2016
Super Cup
Super Cup 2016
Super Cup 2016
Turkish Super Cup
Turkish Super Cup 2016